Oshikoto is one of the fourteen regions of Namibia, named after Lake Otjikoto. Its capital is Omuthiya. The city of Tsumeb, Otjikoto's capital until 2008, and the towns of Omuthiya and Oniipa are also situated in this region. , Oshikoto had 112,170 registered voters.

Geography

Oshikoto Region is named after Lake Otjikoto near its former capital Tsumeb.

Oshikoto is one of only three regions without either a shoreline or a foreign border.  It borders the following regions:
Ohangwena - north
Kavango West - east
Otjozondjupa - southeast
Kunene - southwest
Oshana - west

Demographics
The region's population has grown significantly over recent years, partly as a result of redistribution within the Oshiwambo-speaking area. Apart from Tsumeb and Oniipa, people have settled in a corridor along the trunk road, sometimes forming quite dense concentrations.

Economy and infrastructure

The northern part of the region is crop agriculture, whereas the main economic activities in the southern part are cattle rearing and mining. The two areas have important cultural and historical links in that the Ndonga people have extracted copper at Tsumeb since the earliest times in order to make rings and tools.

Pearl millet (Mahangu) is the principal crop in the north, while cattle are reared in the Mangetti and the Tsumeb district. Although the Tsumeb mine has only a limited life span, it can together with the associated support industries and services, provide a boost for the communal areas of the region.

Communication is good in much of the area: a paved trunk road runs across the region, linking it to both the south and the north of the country. The national microwave network terminates at Tsumeb, but telecommunications are now carried across the region and as far as Oshakati by means of a newly laid optical fiber cable.

According to the 2012 Namibia Labour Force Survey, unemployment in the Oshikoto Region is 26.4%. Oshikoto has 200 schools with a total of 60,439 pupils.

Politics

Oshikoto comprises eleven constituencies:
 Eengodi
 Guinas
 Nehale lyaMpingana
 Okankolo
 Olukonda
 Omuntele
 Omuthiyagwiipundi
 Onayena
 Oniipa
 Onyaanya
 Tsumeb

Regional elections
Electorally, Oshana region is consistently dominated by the South West Africa People's Organization (SWAPO). The 2015 local and regional elections saw SWAPO obtain 98.8% of the votes cast (2010: 95.6%) and win uncontested nine of the eleven constituencies. The remaining two constituencies SWAPO won by a landslide, with results well over 80%. 

Although SWAPO's support dropped to 73.2% of the total votes in the 2020 regional election it again won in all constituencies. Most of the non-SWAPO votes went to the upstart Independent Patriots for Change (IPC), an opposition party formed in August 2020.

Governors
 Penda Ya Ndakolo (2004–2015 and 2020–present)
 Henock Kankoshi (2015–2020)

References

External links

 
Regions of Namibia
Otjiherero words and phrases
States and territories established in 1992
1992 establishments in Namibia